Modified stock car racing, also known as modified racing and modified, is a type of auto racing that involves purpose-built cars simultaneously racing against each other on oval tracks. First established in the United States after World War II, this type of racing was early-on characterized by its participants' modification of passenger cars in pursuit of higher speeds, hence the name.

There are many sanctioning bodies for modifieds, each specifying different body styles and engine sizes.

History

A typical early “modified stock car” was, as it name implies, generally a stock automobile, with the glass removed, a roll cage installed, and a souped-up motor.  NASCAR began by organizing the modifieds, and ran its first race in Daytona Beach in February 1948 at the beach road course.  (In June 1949, NASCAR organized its first “strictly stock” later model car race at Charlotte, NC, which evolved into its well known premiere division.)

What started out as minor modifications to the cars became visibly apparent as the bodies were channeled and lowered. The car builders started mixing and matching components from different car makers.  Some modified classes are no longer based on any current production vehicles.  Modified racing remained popular, particularly on the east coast, and grew away from "strictly stock" or "Late Models", and became akin to both stock cars, and open-wheel cars.  Until the early 1970’s drivers would typically compete on both dirt and asphalt surfaces with the same car.
Modified cars resemble a hybrid of open wheel cars and stock cars. The rear wheels are covered by fenders but the front wheels and engine are left exposed. There are sanctioning bodies that control the rules for this class at most tracks. Each sanctioning body has their own set of guidelines provided in an annual rule book and their own registration fees.

Asphalt modified

Modifieds designed solely for asphalt surfaces began appearing in the early 1970’s, and are found mostly in the eastern half of the US.  Both of the sanctioning bodies (NASCAR and ASA) listed here use the same rules, but do not race on the same tracks.  The cars are easy to identify.  These modifieds sit on large slick tires that are exposed on all four corners of the car.  The roofs of these cars are more rounded than the other types of modifieds, their bodies look somewhat squashed, and have large, Lexan spoilers on the rear of the cars. The driver sits on the left side of the car, and most of the time will have some type of small plastic windshield in front of him or her.  All of these cars sport small NASCAR or ASA stickers on the doors.
The largest builder of modifieds in the US is former driver Maynard Troyer, who (after retiring in 1982) set up shop and in the 1980s was turning out 100 asphalt modifieds annually.
The NSTA Top Speed Modified Tour is located in Carmel, Indiana, and has been around for approximately 30 years (www.TopSpeedMods.com). These asphalt race cars got their start at Mount Lawn Speedway near Indianapolis. It was once called the USA Modified Series. This travelling series races at local short tracks in Indiana, Michigan, and Ohio. In 2013 they raced for the first time on a road course, near South Haven, Michigan, at Gingerman Raceway.  The series changed hands for 2017, from ICAR to NSTA, after being purchased by John Robbins (nephew of the former ASA pioneers) from Dave Muzillo.

NASCAR Whelen Modified tours

Northern Tour

The NASCAR Whelen Modified series is the only remaining NASCAR series from the sanctioning body's original season in 1948. The original style of NASCAR modifieds actually pre-dates NASCAR's existence by many years.  Though it is now known as an asphalt-oval-only series, this was not always the case.  The series originally started on dirt, and as more and more asphalt tracks opened, the series migrated to racing on the newer tracks.  The series also had previously made forays into road racing with stops at Watkins Glen International in New York.  Drivers like Bobby Allison and Red Farmer got their start in the NASCAR Modified series, which was popular both in the south and the Northeast. Many NASCAR Sprint Cup drivers have come from this series, including Ryan Preece, Jimmy Spencer, Geoff Bodine and Steve Park.

Southern tour

In late 2004, NASCAR bought out the Southern Modified Auto Racing Teams (SMART), and promptly renamed it the NASCAR Whelen Southern Modified Tour.  The southern tour uses exactly the same set of rules as the northern tour, but races primarily in the southeastern section of the US. The majority of races on the southern tour schedule occur before late April and after August as not to interfere with weekly racing at Bowman Gray Stadium.
Once per year, the northern tour and the southern tour race at Bristol Motor Speedway, in Bristol, Tennessee. The two tours were permanently merged for the 2016 season.

American Speed Association

ASA Southern Modified Tour
NASCAR's Whelen Southern Modified Tour has a direct competitor in the American Speed Association Southern Modified Tour.  The ASA Southern Modified Tour came about as some tracks that were part of the NASCAR buyout of SMART were unable, or unwilling to join NASCAR.  The ASA was contacted, and the new series was formed.  Although both sanctioning bodies use the same rules (much as NASCAR and ARCA did with the Sprint Cup Series and the ARCA Re/Max Series), they do not share a single race date, nor do they race at any of the same tracks.

Dirt modified

Northeast dirt modified

The late Dick Tobias from Pennsylvania revolutionized the chassis of the dirt track modified stock car class in the early 1970s by producing an entirely homemade chassis constructed of tubular steel.
Race promotors, drivers and car builders who focused on the dirt tracks in northeastern U.S. and southeastern Canada, became eager for standardized rules.  In 1976, the Driver’s Independent Race Tracks (DIRT) was organized, and rules were implemented where the driver sits in the middle of the car, with high-downforce, wind-channeling tunnels on either side of him. Other promoters and sanctioning bodies in the region adopted similar rules shortly thereafter. The roofs are very flat, and tilted to catch additional air.  The front suspension is usually a coil-over setup, with a torsion-bar set-up for the rear suspension. They utilize full tube chassis, which to the untrained eye, looks to be a sprint car chassis, but is much different in reality.

Super DIRTcar Series

The Driver's Independent Race Tracks (DIRT) was acquired by Boundless Racing in June 2004 which had purchased the World of Outlaws in February of that year.  In November 2004, Boundless Racing changed its name to DIRT Motorsports. In December of the same year, DIRT Motorsports bought Midwestern sanctioning body UMP.
The former DIRT big-block (and small block) modified series has seen many changes in their car designs since the 1970s, but the competition and will to win has remained the same.  The ultra-fast, super nimble cars race primarily in the Northeastern US and in Canada, but have had a race added in the Midwest on the 2007 and the 2008 schedules.  NASCAR and World of Outlaws Late Model driver Tim McCreadie came from this series, as did World of Outlaws Late Model drivers Tim Fuller and Vic Coffey. All of those drivers still race in the series on a part-time basis, between 10 and 30 times a year. Notable drivers having competed in DIRT modifieds include Bobby Allison, Tony Stewart, Andrew Ranger, Dave Blaney, Carl Edwards, J. J. Yeley and David Reutimann.

Short Track Super Series
Originated in 2013 by Brett Deyo and BD Motorsports Media LLC, the Short Track Super Series expanded by 2022 to 20 different race tracks in New York, Vermont, New Jersey, Delaware, Pennsylvania, Florida and Louisiana. It is the only Northeast dirt modified series to present two events offering $50,000-plus to win annually: one at Port Royal Speedway in Pennsylvania and another at Fonda Speedway in New York.

Midwest dirt modified
While modified racing remained popular on the east coast, varieties of the "strictly stock" / "late models" became the primary class in other parts of the country.  In the late 1970’s the dirt modified was re-introduced in the Midwest as  a mid-level class between late models and hobby stocks.  
One of the most notable differences in the Midwest modified series cars is the use of stock production car frame sections as part of the racing chassis.  These cars also race on smaller tires than the other types of modifieds, with most sanctioning bodies specifying the same tire.  The Midwest dirt modified bodies are very flat on the sides, and lack the downforce generating tunnels the Northeast dirt modifieds sport.  The driver sits on the left side.

IMCA/WISSOTA/UMP Modifieds

Organized in 1915, the International Motor Contest Association (IMCA) is the oldest racing sanctioning body in the US.  IMCA introduced the "E-Mod" (or Economy Modified) in 1979.  It has become one of the most popular dirt racing classes due to its simple design, light-weight, high power, and ability to adapt to varying track conditions easily.  Most IMCA-style classes also boast a "claim rule," wherein a racer may buy a competitors engine for a small amount of money (usually around $500).  This rule was intended to keep engine prices from skyrocketing.  
The IMCA Sportmods appear very similar to their brethren, but have distinctly different engines.  The Afco KidModz appear the same as the others, but sport full tube chassis, and by rules, have to have Ford 2300 cc inline 4-cylinder engines.
Sanctioning bodies WISSOTA and United Midwestern Promoters (UMP) also have classes that are almost identical to IMCA's modifieds, with a few small exceptions.  The AMRA, or American Motor Racing Association also follows this popular formula for modifieds.  NASCAR drivers Ken Schrader and Kenny Wallace own and race UMP Modifieds on off weekends from NASCAR. Some tracks sanction modifieds with IMCA-like specifications, such as Slinger Super Speedway.

IMCA SportMods
IMCA designed a new lower-cost class of SportMod cars in 2004 to complement their Modified division. The division is divided into Northern SportMods and Southern SportMods divisions. The Northern SportMods have a few small differences from the Southern SportMods in the body of the car. These cars are somewhat smaller and have less powerful engines. They can be differentiated from IMCA Modifieds because the car has a break in the body that extends from the rear roof to the spoiler at the rear.

Afco KidModz
This relatively inexpensive (when compared to their "adult" counterparts) racing series is aimed at getting children into racing.  It closely follows UMP's Modified rules, with the exception of a few areas.  The engine must be a 2300 cc Ford inline 4-cylinder, and the drivers can be no younger than 12, nor older than 18.  Some tracks will allow kids 10 or 11 to race if the track's insurance will allow.  The KidModz are also allowed to run tubular chassis, whereas the IMCA/WISSOTA/UMP Modifieds have to have sections of frames from stock production automobiles, with other sections being steel tubing. These cars are offered for sale completely assembled and ready-to-race for under $20,000. The unassembled price is lower.

Outlaw Modifieds

GLOM
Found in the Midwestern United States, the Great Lakes Outlaw Modifieds (GLOM) are a cross between IMCA Modifieds, and UMP Late Models.  These cars have nearly the same hand-made aluminum bodies as their UMP Late Model counterparts (without front fenders), feature tubular chassis, and sport unrestricted engines with aluminum engine blocks and heads.  They also are allowed to utilize quick-change rear ends and aluminum wheels, whereas the IMCA modifieds are forced to race with heavier cast-iron engines, partial stock frames, steel wheels and Ford  rear ends.

Ark-La-Tex
One type of Outlaw Modified can be found in the Arkansas, Louisiana, and Texas area.  Oddly enough, they are called Ark-La-Tex Winged Modifieds.  These outlaw modifieds sport full tube chassis, and bodies that look like the Advanced Auto Parts Super DIRTcar racers, with the exception of the sprint car-like wing affixed to the roofs of the cars. These cars can also be found deeper into Texas such as Dallas and Waco. They are not always bodies that look like the Advance Auto Parts Super DIRTcar racer with a wing, some of the Winged Modifieds use bodies called skinny bodies that are not currently being made, but some drivers still have these. Winged Modified racing began at Boothill Speedway in Greenwood, LA and spread throughout the area, soon Heart O' Texas Speedway in Waco, TX was running them, so on Friday nights anybody from the Ark-La-Tex would go over to Waco and drive Winged Modifieds there, and on Saturday night they were at Boothill Speedway. Some of the nation biggest legends started out racing winged modifieds such as; Sprint Car Veteran Gary Wright of Hooks, TX, National Dirt Late Model Hall of Famer and Boothill Speedway Hall of Fame Inductee Doug Ingalls of Longview, TX, Boothill Speedway Hall of Fame inductee "Papa" Ray Ingalls of Longview, TX, Late Model Veteran and Boothill Speedway Hall of Fame inductee Ronny Adams of Greenwood, LA, Heart O' Texas Speedway Wall of Fame inductee Eldon Dotson of Allen, TX, Heart O' Texas Speedway Wall of Fame inductee Joe Sturdivant of Elgin, TX and 2010 Ark-La-Tex Wing Modified Champion, 2011 SMP Series Longhorn Champion and 38th Annual Louisiana State Dirt Track Championships winner at Boothill Speedway 19-year-old Tyler Townsend out of Longview, TX.

AOMRA
One type of outlaw modified in Alberta, Canada, races on both dirt and asphalt, with the same cars.  Started in the mid-1980s, the Alberta Outlaw Modified Racing Association (AOMRA) races in Alberta, British Columbia, and Saskatchewan.  They look like a cross between IMCA modifieds, and old NASCAR modifieds.

Outlaw Modified Racing Series
Organized in Florida in the 1970s, these Outlaw Modifieds are fairly unusual.  They are built on tube chassis with coil over shocks.   tires and a  track make these cars are fast and nimble.  2300 cc, Four-cylinder power plants from Fords, Toyotas and even an odd Nissan are common, however the Ford 2300's are the favored motor.  Motor rules have stayed very stable over the last 10 years with the only rule change coming in 2008 which allowed the Esslinger aluminum d-port head, due to the declining availability of the cast-iron cylinder heads.  One thing that sets these cars apart from most modified racing series, is that these cars do not utilize roofs on the cars.

SuperModifieds

Another type of modified popular in the Southwestern, and Northeastern parts of the US, is the "SuperModified."  Super Mods are low-slung, almost body-less modifieds that utilize wings on its chassis to achieve enough downforce to take turns at extremely high speeds. They also feature engines that are offset to the driver's side, also, to aid in taking turns at high speed.  There are 4 sanctioning bodies in America that sanction supermodified racing.  The New York-based International Supermodified Association (ISMA), is the largest of the four and a true touring series. The ISMA SuperMods are a bit more technologically advanced, in that the wings attached to the roofs of the cars move.  When racing down the straightaways, the wings are almost level.  When the car gets to the corners, the back of wing tilts upward, adding downforce to the car.

Scale cars

Legends car racing

US Legend Cars International of Charlotte, North Carolina created the Legends series (while they were named 600 Motorsports) as a way of getting more and younger people into racing with affordable cars. The cars were designed to be 5/8-scale 1930s and 1940s coupes and sedans cars raced in the past in the NASCAR Modified Tour.  They all feature a tube chassis, and spec 1250 cc Yamaha Motorcycle engines.

Dwarf cars

Dwarf cars are similar to the Legends cars, in that they are scale replicas of vintage race cars.  The similarity ends there, as Dwarf cars are true open "modified-style" cars without fenders, and have a  limitation on the engine size. The Western States Dwarf Car Association, begun in 1993, has become one of the most successful racing organizations in history, boasting an average of 80–100 Dwarf Cars at 4 National, and several regional, events a year.
There is also a class of Dwarf Cars that race on dirt called the Vintage Lite Series. They race a mixed field of cars, some resembling the vintage cars and some scaled-down versions of the current modified dirt cars (these cars are often referred to as the MiniMods).

ModLites.

A ModLite is a 5/8th scale of a Dirt Modified.

References

Further reading

SK Modified Story by Jack Arute, Sr. (Jack Arute's father)
Orange County, East Coast Modifieds plus history
Stock car history, has mentioning about East Coast and IMCA modified histories
Midwest Modified Association, an interesting local division
USMTS a National tour

External links

*NASCAR
Top Speed Modifieds (NSTA)
American Speed Association (ASA)
United Midwestern Promoters (UMP)
International Motor Contest Association (IMCA)
600 Racing
dwarfworld.com
DwarfCarRacing.com
DwarfCar.com
Modliteresource.com – Dwarf Car and Modified Lite Resource
Western States Super Modified Racing League
International SuperModified Association
Ark-La-Tex Winged Modified Association
Alberta Outlaw Modified Association
Outlaw Modified Association

Stock car racing
Auto racing by type
Articles containing video clips